Chloroacetaldehyde is an organic compound with the formula  ClCH2CHO. Like some related compounds, it is highly electrophilic reagent and a potentially dangerous alkylating agent. The compound is not normally encountered in the anhydrous form, but rather as the hemiacetal (ClCH2CH(OH))2O.

Chloroacetaldehyde is a metabolite of the antineoplastic ifosfamide and believed to be responsible for some of the toxicity observed with ifosfamide.

Synthesis and reactions
Hydrated chloroacetaldehyde is produced by the chlorination of aqueous vinyl chloride:
ClCH=CH2  +  Cl2  +  H2O   →   ClCH2CHO  +  2 HCl
It can also be prepared from vinyl acetate or by careful chlorination of acetaldehyde. The related bromoacetaldehyde is prepared via bromination of vinyl acetate. It also rapidly forms an acetals in the presence of alcohols.

Being bifunctional, chloroacetaldehyde is a versatile precursor to many heterocyclic compounds. It condenses with thiourea derivatives to give aminothiazoles. This reaction was an important in the preparation of sulfathiazole, one of the first sulfa drugs. Chloroacetaldehyde is a building block in the synthesis of the pharmaceuticals altizide, polythiazide, brotizolam and ciclotizolam. as  Another use is to facilitate bark removal from tree trunks.

Anhydrous
Water free chloroacetaldehyde is prepared from the hydrate by  azeotropic distillation with chloroform, toluene, or carbon tetrachloride. Anhydrous chloroacetaldehyde reversibly converts to polyacetals. Less reactive chloroacetaldehyde derivatives might be used instead to obtain chloroacetaldehyde or bypass its intermediate formation completely: e.g. chloroacetaldehyde dimethyl acetal (2-chloro-1,1-dimethoxyethane) hydrolyzes in acidic conditions to give chloroacetaldehyde, which may then quickly react with the other reagents instead of polymerizing.

Hemihydrate
Hemihydrate is formed as below. It has a melting point of 43–50 °C, boiling point of 85.5 °C.

Environmental aspects
Chloroacetaldehyde is a metabolite in the degradation of 1,2-dichloroethane, which initially converts to chloroethanol. This metabolic pathway is topical because 1,2-dichloroethane is produced on a large as a precursor to vinyl chloride.

Safety
Chloroacetaldehyde is corrosive to mucous membranes. It irritates eyes, skin and respiratory tract.

Based on data collected from human studies in 1962, exposures to 45 ppm of chloroacetaldehyde were found to be disagreeable and caused conjunctival irritation to the subjects. The Occupational Safety and Health Administration established a permissible exposure limit at a ceiling of 1 ppm (3 mg/m3) for exposures to chloroacetaldehyde.

References

Aldehydes
Organochlorides